"Freight Train" is an American folk song written by Elizabeth Cotten in the early 20th century, and popularized during the American folk revival and British skiffle period of the 1950s and 1960s.  By Cotten's own account in the 1985 BBC series Down Home, she composed “Freight Train” as a teenager (sometime between 1906 and 1912), inspired by the sound of the trains rolling in on the tracks near her home in North Carolina.

Cotten was a one-time nanny for folk singer Peggy Seeger, who took this song with her to England, where it became popular in folk music circles.  British songwriters Paul James and Fred Williams subsequently misappropriated it as their own composition and registered a claim of copyright in the song.  Under their credit, it was then recorded by British skiffle singer Chas McDevitt, who recorded the song in December, 1956.  Under advice from his manager (Bill Varley), McDevitt then brought in folk-singer Nancy Whiskey and re-recorded the song with her doing the vocal; the result was a chart hit. McDevitt's version influenced many young skiffle groups of the day, including The Quarrymen. Under the advocacy of the influential Seeger family, the copyright was eventually restored to Cotten.  Nevertheless, it remains mis-credited in many sources.

The Elizabeth Cotten recording for the Folksongs and Instrumentals with Guitar album was made by Mike Seeger in late 1957, early 1958, at Cotten's home in Washington, D.C. Ramblin' Jack Elliott recorded this song in 1957.  It is included on the CD, The Lost Topic Tapes: Cowes Harbour 1957.

Beatles cover versions
According to author Mark Lewisohn, in The Complete Beatles Chronicles (p. 362), the young Quarrymen-Beatles performed it live from 1957 till at least 1959, if not later, with John Lennon on lead vocal. No recorded version is known to survive. However, in January 1991, while doing recorded rehearsals in Sussex, England for the initial Unplugged TV show, Paul McCartney and his band performed various classic skiffle songs. The concluding number was "Freight Train", though it was abruptly stopped just a few seconds into the song (this recording is available on an unauthorized release called Paul McCartney Limelight). In 2009 Quarrymen member Rod Davis recorded the song and released it on his album Under The Influence.

Notable cover versions
Many artists have since recorded their own version of the song. Among the most prominent are:
Chas McDevitt Skiffle Group featuring Nancy Whiskey (No. 5 on the UK Singles Chart in 1957)
Rusty Draper (charted to the US top ten, end of 1957)
Esther and Abi Ofarim (israeli singers who recorded it on their american folk album, end of 1963) 
Esther Ofarim (Le Train, french version, 1965)

See also
 List of train songs

References

External links

Eclectica.org

1900s songs
Songs about trains
1956 singles
Peter, Paul and Mary songs
Esther & Abi Ofarim songs